Nancy Williams Watt is an American writer known for her work on television soap operas.  She was born in Brooklyn, NY on June 9, 1948, to Associated Press editor Edward Williams and newswoman Sheila O'Brien Williams Barnes.

Positions held
All My Children
Secretary to Agnes Nixon, Wisner Washam, Jack Wood, Lorraine Broderick, Caroline Franz et al. (1979–1981)

Days of Our Lives
Script Writer (April 2, 2012 – July 27, 2012)
Associate Head Writer (September 13, 2011 – March 30, 2012)

Search for Tomorrow
Script Writer/Breakdown Writer (1983–1985)

Passions (hired by James E. Reilly)
Script Writer (1999 – September 2007)

Guiding Light
Script Writer/Outline Writer (1986–1993)
Co-Head Writer (1994 – November 1994)
Script Editor/Associate Headwriter (1993–1999)

Awards and nominations
She has been nominated for nine Daytime Emmy awards in the category Outstanding Drama Series Writing Team from 1989 to 2003, and won three times, twice for Guiding Light in 1990 and 1993 and also for Days of Our Lives in 2011–2012.  Her first nomination was shared with Pamela K. Long, Trent Jones, Nancy Curlee, Stephen Demorest, Richard Culliton, Pete T. Rich, Melissa Salmons, and N. Gail Lawrence, while her first win was shared with the previous plus Jeff Ryder, Garret Foster, Peter Brash, and Patty Gideon Sloan.

Williams Watt has also been nominated for seven Writers Guild of America Awards, in the Daytime Serials category, from 1989 to 2001, and won once in 1992. Her first nomination was shared with Pamela K. Long, Stephen Demorest, Trent Jones, Melissa Salmons, Pete T. Rich, Nancy Curlee, N. Gail Lawrence, Richard Culliton, and Nancy Franklin, while her win was shared with the latter, minus Jones, Culliton and Franklin, and including James E. Reilly, Bill Elverman, and Michael Conforti.

Daytime Emmy Awards

WINS
(1990 & 1993; Best Writing; Guiding Light)
(2012; Best Writing; Days of Our Lives)

NOMINATIONS 
(1989, 1992 & 1999; Best Writing; Guiding Light)
(2001, 2002 & 2003; Best Writing; Passions)

Writers Guild of America Award

WINS
(1992 season; Guiding Light)
(2014 season; Days of Our Lives)

NOMINATIONS 
(1989, 1995, 1996, 1998 & 1999 seasons; Guiding Light)
(2001 season; Passions)
(2013 season; Days of Our Lives)

Head writing tenure

External links
 

1948 births
American soap opera writers
Living people
Daytime Emmy Award winners
Women soap opera writers
American women television writers
Writers Guild of America Award winners
21st-century American women